The Leon Gaspard House, also known as Gaspard House Museum, was the Taos, New Mexico home of Russian artist Leon Gaspard who became a member of the Taos art colony. The house was listed as a National Register of Historic Places in 1979.

It is now a private residence.

Gallery

See also

National Register of Historic Places listings in Taos County, New Mexico

References

External links

Adobe buildings and structures in New Mexico
Artists' studios in the United States
Historic house museums in New Mexico
Houses on the National Register of Historic Places in New Mexico
Houses in Taos County, New Mexico
National Register of Historic Places in Taos County, New Mexico
Pueblo Revival architecture in Taos, New Mexico